Vincent Joseph Tringali (August 1, 1928 – May 31, 2010) was an American football player and coach. He played college football at the University of San Francisco where he was on a line that included future National Football League (NFL) players Gino Marchetti, Dick Stanfel, and Bob St. Clair.

After a successful run as the head football coach at St. Ignatius College Preparatory school in San Francisco, California, he served as the final head coach at USF, from 1969 to 1971, before the program was shut down.

Tringali is noted for convincing future NFL player Igor Olshansky to play high school football.

Head coaching record

College

References

1928 births
2010 deaths
American football tackles
San Francisco Dons football coaches
San Francisco Dons football players
High school football coaches in California
Players of American football from San Francisco